Bergsdalen is a river valley in Vaksdal Municipality in Vestland county, Norway. The valley then runs to the northwest along the river Bergsdalselvi all the way to the village of Dale where the valley ends. This valley was historically part of the main route between the city of Bergen and Voss, until the European route E16 highway was built to the north of the valley.  

The Bergsdalen valley now is home to a significant number of mountain cabins and there is especially a lot of tourist activity in the winter.  There are about 100 year-round residents of the valley.  There is a small school and Bergsdalen Church.

References

Vaksdal
Valleys of Vestland